Petroravenia is a genus of plants in the family Brassicaceae, first described in 1994. There are to date only two species proposed as members of the genus:

Petroravenia eseptata Al-Shehbaz from Argentina
Petroravenia friesii (O.E. Schulz) Al-Shehbaz from Chile

The genus Petroravenia was named in honor of Peter H. Raven, President Emeritus of the Missouri Botanical Garden in St. Louis. The plants are superficially similar to those of the genus Draba, but differ from them in several technical fruit and seed characters. Most important of these is Petroravenia's lack of septum diving the fruit into two compartments, which is the usual case in the family.

References

Brassicaceae
Brassicaceae genera